National Highway 709A, commonly called NH 709A is a national highway in  India. It is a spur road of National Highway 9. NH-709A traverses the states of Haryana and Uttar Pradesh in India. Karnal to Meerut section has been upgraded from 4 lanes to 6 lanes by Public Works Department, Haryana.

Route 

Haryana
Bhiwani - Mundal - Jind - Karnal - Uttar Pradesh Border.

Uttar Pradesh
Haryana Border - Shamli - Budhana - Meerut - Garhmukteshwar.

Junctions list  

  Terminal near Bhiwani.
  near Mundhal Khurd.
  near Jind.
  near Karnal.
  near Shamli.
  near Shamli.
  near Meerut.
  Terminal near Garhmukteshwar.

See also 
 List of National Highways in India by highway number
 List of National Highways in India by state

References

External links 
 NH 709A on OpenStreetMap

National highways in India
National Highways in Haryana
National Highways in Uttar Pradesh